Joseph Stewart Burns (born December 4, 1969), better known as J. Stewart Burns, is a television writer and producer most notable for his work on The Simpsons, Futurama, and Unhappily Ever After.

Education 
Burns attended Harvard University, where he wrote for the Harvard Lampoon.

Noted in the DVD commentaries of "The Deep South" and "Roswell That Ends Well", Burns has an M.A. in Mathematics from the University of California, Berkeley, where he studied under John Rhodes. Burns is partly credited for The Simpsons’ inclusion of a number of complex mathematical concepts and jokes within the series.

Burns was famously referenced in a 1993 Newsweek article about his decision to jump from pursuing a graduate degree in mathematics to writing comedy: "You could read the entire story of American decline in that one career move."

Career 
Burns got his start by writing for Beavis and Butthead. Since then, he has written for The Simpsons, Futurama, and Unhappily Ever After.

Aside from writing on the original series, Burns also wrote the script for the Futurama video game as well as one of the Spyro games, Spyro: A Hero's Tail. Burns developed and has served as the game runner of The Simpsons: Tapped Out since its inception.

Awards 
Burns has won the Emmy Award for Outstanding Animation Program four times - for Futurama in 2002, and for The Simpsons in 2006, 2008 and 2019.

Writing credits

The Simpsons episodes 
"Moe Baby Blues" (2003)
"The Way We Weren't" (2004)
"There's Something About Marrying" (2005)
"The Monkey Suit" (2006)
"Homerazzi" (2007)
"Marge Gamer" (2007)
"Eternal Moonshine of the Simpson Mind" (2007)
"Waverly Hills 9-0-2-1-D'oh" (2009)
"Holidays of Future Passed" (2011)
"The D'oh-cial Network" (2012)
"What Animated Women Want" (2013)
"Steal This Episode" (2014)
"Days of Future Future" (2014)
"Simpsorama" (2014)
"Every Man's Dream" (2015)
"Puffless" (2015)
"Fland Canyon" (2016)
"Friends and Family" (2016)
"Dogtown" (2017)
"Flanders' Ladder" (2018)
"Treehouse of Horror XXX" (2019)
"The Miseducation of Lisa Simpson" (2020)
"Screenless" (2020)
"Mother and Child Reunion" (2021)
"Write Off This Episode" (2023)

Upcoming The Simpsons episodes 
"Write Off This Episode" (TBA)

Supervising producer credits

The Simpsons episodes 
 "The Great Louse Detective" (2002)
 "Special Edna" (2003)
 "The Dad Who Knew Too Little" (2003)
 "The Strong Arms of the Ma" (2003)
 "Pray Anything" (2003)
 "Barting Over" (2003)
 "I'm Spelling As Fast As I Can" (2003)
 "A Star Is Born Again" (2003)
 "Mr. Spritz Goes to Washington" (2003)
 "C.E. D'oh" (2003)
 'Scuse Me While I Miss the Sky" (2003)
 "Three Gays of the Condo" (2003)
 "Dude, Where's My Ranch?" (2003)
 "Old Yeller-Belly" (2003)
 "Brake My Wife, Please" (2003)
 "Moe Baby Blues" (2003)
 "The Bart of War" (2003)
 "Treehouse of Horror XIV" (2003) (starring as "Here Lies J. Stewart Burns")
 "My Mother the Carjacker" (2003)
 "The President Wore Pearls" (2003)
 "The Regina Monologues" (2003)
 "The Fat and the Furriest" (2003)
 "Today I Am a Clown" (2003)
 'Tis the Fifteenth Season" (2003)

Co-executive producer credits

The Simpsons episodes 
 "Marge vs. Singles, Seniors, Childless Couples and Teens and Gays" (2004)
 "I, (Annoyed Grunt)-bot" (2004)
 "Diatribe of a Mad Housewife" (2004)
 "Margical History Tour" (2004)
 "Milhouse Doesn't Live Here Anymore" (2004)
 "Smart and Smarter" (2004)
 "The Ziff Who Came to Dinner" (2004)
 "Co-Dependents' Day" (2004)
 "The Wandering Juvie" (2004)
 "My Big Fat Geek Wedding" (2004)
 "Catch 'Em If You Can" (2004)
 "Simple Simpson" (2004)
 "The Way We Weren't" (2004)
 "Bart-Mangled Banner" (2004)
 "Fraudcast News" (2004)
 "Treehouse of Horror XV" (2004) (as J. Stewart Burns In Hell)
 "All's Fair in Oven War" (2004)
 "Sleeping with the Enemy" (2004)
 "She Used to Be My Girl" (2004)
 "Fat Man and Little Boy" (2004)
 "Midnight Rx" (2005)
 "Mommie Beerest" (2005)
 "Homer and Ned's Hail Mary Pass" (2005)
 "Pranksta Rap" (2005)
 "There's Something About Marrying" (2005)
 "On a Clear Day I Can't See My Sister" (2005)
 "Goo Goo Gai Pan" (2005)
 "Mobile Homer" (2005)
 "The Seven-Beer Snitch" (2005)
 "Future-Drama" (2005)
 "Don't Fear the Roofer" (2005)
 "The Heartbroke Kid" (2005)
 "A Star Is Torn" (2005)
 "Thank God It's Doomsday" (2005)
 "Home Away from Homer" (2005)
 "The Father, the Son and the Holy Guest Star" (2005)
 "The Bonfire of the Manatees" (2005)
 "The Girl Who Slept Too Little" (2005)
 "Milhouse of Sand and Fog" (2005)
 "Treehouse of Horror XVI" (2005) (as J. Stewart Burns At The Stake)
 "Marge's Son Poisoning" (2005)
 "See Homer Run" (2005)
 "The Last of the Red Hat Mamas" (2005)
 "The Italian Bob" (2005)
 "Simpsons Christmas Stories" (2005)
 "Homer's Paternity Coot" (2006)
 "We're on the Road to D'ohwhere" (2006)
 "My Fair Laddy" (2006)
 "The Seemingly Never-Ending Story" (2006)
 "Bart Has Two Mommies" (2006)
 "Homer Simpson, This Is Your Wife" (2006)
 "Million-Dollar Abie" (2006)
 "Kiss Kiss Bang Bangalore" (2006)
 "Girls Just Want to Have Sums" (2006)
 "Regarding Margie" (2006)
 "The Monkey Suit" (2006)
 "Marge and Homer Turn a Couple Play" (2006)
 "The Mook, the Chef, the Wife and Her Homer" (2006)
 "Jazzy and the Pussycats" (2006)
 "Please Homer, Don't Hammer 'Em" (2006)
 "Treehouse of Horror XVII" (2006) (Starring as J.St=ewart=Bµrns)
 "G.I. (Annoyed Grunt)" (2006)
 "Moe'N'a Lisa" (2006)
 "Ice Cream of Margie (with the Light Blue Hair)" (2006)
 "The Haw-Hawed Couple" (2006)
 "Kill Gil, Volumes I & II" (2006)
 "The Wife Aquatic" (2007)
 "Revenge Is a Dish Best Served Three Times" (2007)
 "Little Big Girl" (2007)
 "Springfield Up" (2007)
 "Yokel Chords" (2007)
 "Rome-Old and Juli-Eh" (2007)
 "Homerazzi" (2007)
 "Marge Gamer" (2007)
 "The Boys of Bummer" (2007)
 "Crook and Ladder" (2007)
 "Stop or My Dog Will Shoot!" (2007)
 "24 Minutes" (2007)
 "You Kent Always Say What You Want" (2007)
 "He Loves to Fly and He D'ohs" (2007)
 "The Homer of Seville" (2007)
 "Midnight Towboy" (2007)
 "I Don't Wanna Know Why the Caged Bird Sings" (2007)
 "Treehouse of Horror XVIII" (2007) (Starring as Jth Degree Burns)
 "Little Orphan Millie" (2007)
 "Husbands and Knives" (2007)
 "Funeral for a Fiend" (2007)
 "Eternal Moonshine of the Simpson Mind" (2007)
 "E Pluribus Wiggum" (2008)
 "That '90s Show"
 "Love, Springfieldian Style"
 "The Debarted"
 "Dial 'N' for Nerder"
 "Smoke on the Daughter"
 "Papa Don't Leech"
 "Apocalypse Cow"
 "Any Given Sundance"
 "Mona Leaves-a"
 "All About Lisa"
 "Sex, Pies and Idiot Scrapes"
 "Lost Verizon"
 "Double, Double, Boy in Trouble"
 "Treehouse of Horror XIX" (Starring as J. Boo-Art-Boo-Urns)
 "Dangerous Curves"
 "Homer and Lisa Exchange Cross Words"
 "MyPods and Boomsticks"
 "The Burns and the Bees"
 "Lisa the Drama Queen"
 "Take My Life, Please"
 "How the Test Was Won"
 "No Loan Again, Naturally"
 "Gone Maggie Gone"
 "In the Name of the Grandfather"
 "Wedding for Disaster"
 "Eeny Teeny Maya Moe"
 "The Good, the Sad, and the Drugly"
 "Father Knows Worst"
 "Waverly Hills 9-0-2-1-D'oh"
 "Four Great Women and a Manicure"
 "Coming to Homerica"
 "Homer the Whopper"
 "Bart Gets a 'Z'
 "The Great Wife Hope"
 "Treehouse of Horror XX" (Starring as J. O-Lantern Burns)
 "The Devil Wears Nada"
 "Pranks and Greens"
 "Rednecks and Broomsticks"
 "Oh Brother, Where Bart Thou?"
 "Thursdays with Abie"
 "Once Upon a Time in Springfield"
 "Million Dollar Maybe"
 "Boy Meets Curl"
 "The Color Yellow"
 "Postcards from the Wedge"
 "Stealing First Base"
 "The Greatest Story Ever D'ohed"
 "American History X-cellent"
 "Chief of Hearts"
 "The Squirt and the Whale"
 "To Surveil with Love"
 "Moe Letter Blues"
 "The Bob Next Door"
 "Judge Me Tender"
 "Elementary School Musical"
 "Loan-a Lisa"
 "MoneyBart"
 "Treehouse of Horror XXI" (Starring as J. Disco Stu Mr. Burns)
 "Lisa Simpson, This Isn't Your Life"
 "The Fool Monty"
 "How Munched Is That Birdie in the Window?"
 "The Fight Before Christmas"
 "Donnie Fatso"
 "Moms I'd Like to Forget"
 "Flaming Moe"
 "Homer the Father"
 "The Blue and the Gray"
 "Angry Dad: The Movie"
 "The Scorpion's Tale"
 "A Midsummer's Nice Dream"
 "Love Is a Many Strangled Thing"
 "The Great Simpsina"
 "The Real Housewives of Fat Tony"
 "Homer Scissorhands"
 "500 Keys"
 "The Ned-liest Catch"
 "The Falcon and the D'ohman"
 "Bart Stops to Smell the Roosevelts"
 "Treehouse of Horror XXII" (Starring as The Gruesome Stewsome)
 "Replaceable You"
 "The Food Wife"
 "The Book Job"
 "The Man in the Blue Flannel Pants"
 "The Ten-Per-Cent Solution"
 "Holidays of Future Passed"
 "Politically Inept, with Homer Simpson"
 "The D'oh-cial Network"
 "Moe Goes from Rags to Riches"
 "The Daughter Also Rises"
 "At Long Last Leave"
 "Exit Through the Kwik-E-Mart"
 "How I Wet Your Mother"
 "Them, Robot"
 "Beware My Cheating Bart"
 "A Totally Fun Thing That Bart Will Never Do Again"
 "The Spy Who Learned Me"
 "Ned 'n' Edna's Blend Agenda"
 "Lisa Goes Gaga"
 "Moonshine River"
 "Treehouse of Horror XXIII" (Starring as The Witch's Stew Burns)
 "Adventures in Baby-Getting"
 "Gone Abie Gone"
 "Penny-Wiseguys"
 "A Tree Grows in Springfield"
 "The Day the Earth Stood Cool"
 "To Cur, with Love"
 "Homer Goes to Prep School"
 "A Test Before Trying"
 "The Changing of the Guardian"
 "Love Is a Many-Splintered Thing"
 "Hardly Kirk-ing"
 "Gorgeous Grampa"
 "Black-Eyed, Please"
 "Dark Knight Court"
 "What Animated Women Want"
 "Pulpit Friction"
 "Whiskey Business"
 "The Fabulous Faker Boy"
 "Dangers on a Train"
 "The Saga of Carl"
 "Homerland"
 "Treehouse of Horror XXIV" (Starring as J. Screwit Burns)
 "Four Regrettings and a Funeral"
 "YOLO"
 "Labor Pains"
 "The Kid Is All Right"
 "Yellow Subterfuge"
 "White Christmas Blues"
 "Steal This Episode"
 "Married to the Blob"
 "Specs and the City"
 "The Man Who Grew Too Much"
 "Diggs"
 "The Winter of His Content"
 "The War of Art"
 "You Don't Have to Live Like a Referee"
 "Luca$"
 "Days of Future Future"
 "What to Expect When Bart's Expecting"
 "Brick Like Me"
 "Pay Pal"
 "The Yellow Badge of Cowardge"
 "The Simpsons Take the Bowl"
 "Clown in the Dumps"
 "The Wreck of the Relationship"
 "Super Franchise Me"
 "Treehouse of Horror XXV" (Starring as Jay Stuart Byrnes)
 "Opposites A-Frack"
 "Simpsorama"
 "Blazed and Confused"
 "Covercraft"
 "I Won't Be Home for Christmas"
 "The Man Who Came to Be Dinner"
 "Bart's New Friend"
 "The Musk Who Fell to Earth"
 "Walking Big & Tall"
 "My Fair Lady"
 "The Princess Guide"
 "Sky Police"
 "Waiting for Duffman"
 "Peeping Mom"
 "The Kids Are All Fight"
 "Let's Go Fly a Coot"
 "Bull-E"
 "Mathlete's Feat"
 "Every Man's Dream"
 "'Cue Detective"
 "Puffless"
 "Halloween of Horror"
 "Treehouse of Horror XXVI" (Strraing as Junk Status Bonds)
 "Friend with Benefit"
 "Lisa with an 'S'
 "Paths of Glory"
 "Barthood"
 "The Girl Code"
 "Teenage Mutant Milk-Caused Hurdles"
 "Much Apu About Something"
 "Love Is in the N2-O2-Ar-CO2-Ne-He-CH4"
 "Gal of Constant Sorrow"
 "Lisa the Veterinarian"
 "The Marge-ian Chronicles"
 "The Burns Cage"
 "How Lisa Got Her Marge Back"
 "Fland Canyon"
 "To Courier with Love"
 "Simprovised"
 "Orange Is the New Yellow"
 "Monty Burns' Fleeing Circus"
 "Friends and Family"
 "The Town"
 "Treehouse of Horror XXVII" (Starring as J. Sewer Rat Burns)
 "Planet of the Couches"
 "Trust but Clarify"
 "There Will Be Buds"
 "Havana Wild Weekend"
 "Dad Behavior"
 "The Last Traction Hero"
 "The Nightmare After Krustmas"
 "Pork and Burns"
 "The Great Phatsby"
 "Fatzcarraldo"
 "The Cad and the Hat"
 "Kamp Krustier"
 "22 for 30"
 "A Father's Watch"
 "The Caper Chase"
 "Looking for Mr. Goodbart"
 "Moho House"
 "Dogtown"
 "The Serfsons"
 "Springfield Splendor"
 "Whistler's Father"
 "Treehouse of Horror XXVIII" (Starring as Trey Newsquirt Burns)
 "Grampy Can Ya Hear Me"
 "The Old Blue Mayor She Ain't What She Used to Be"
 "Singin' in the Lane"
 "Mr. Lisa's Opus"
 "Gone Boy"
 "Haw-Haw Land"
 "Frink Gets Testy"
 "Homer Is Where the Art Isn't"
 "3 Scenes Plus a Tag from a Marriage"
 "Fears of a Clown"
 "No Good Read Goes Unpunished"
 "King Leer"
 "Lisa Gets the Blues"
 "Forgive and Regret"
 "Left Behind"
 "Throw Grampa from the Dane"
 "Flanders' Ladder"
 "Bart's Not Dead"
 "Heartbreak Hotel"
 "My Way or the Highway to Heaven"
 "Treehouse of Horror XXIX" (Starring as Snrub Trawets J)
 "Baby You Can't Drive My Car"
 "From Russia Without Love"
 "Werking Mom"
 "Krusty the Clown (episode)"
 "Daddicus Finch"
 'Tis the 30th Season"
 "Mad About the Toy"
 "The Girl on the Bus"
 "I'm Dancing as Fat as I Can"
 "The Clown Stays in the Picture"
 "101 Mitigations"
 "I Want You (She's So Heavy)"
 "E My Sports"
 "Bart vs. Itchy & Scratchy"
 "Girl's in the Band"
 "I'm Just a Girl Who Can't Say D'oh"
 "D'oh Canada"
 "Woo-Hoo Dunnit?"
 "Crystal Blue-Haired Persuasion"
 "The Winter of Our Monetized Content"
 "Go Big or Go Homer"
 "The Fat Blue Line"
 "Treehouse of Horror XXX" (Starring as J. Strewn Bones)
 "Gorillas on the Mast"
 "Marge the Lumberjill"
 "Livin La Pura Vida"
 "Thanksgiving of Horror" (Starring as J. Stuffing Birds)
 "Todd, Todd, Why Hast Thou Forsaken Me?"
 "Bobby, It's Cold Outside"
 "Hail to the Teeth"
 "The Miseducation of Lisa Simpson"
 "Frinkcoin"
 "Bart the Bad Guy"
 "Screenless"
 "Better Off Ned"
 "Highway to Well"
 "The Incredible Lightness of Being a Baby"
 "Warrin' Priests: Part One"
 "Warrin' Priests: Part Two"
 "The Hateful Eight-Year-Olds"
 "The Way of the Dog"
 "Undercover Burns"
 "I, Carumbus"
 "Now Museum, Now You Don't"
 "Treehouse of Horror XXXI" (Starring as J. Stewicide Burns)
 "The 7 Beer Itch"
 "Podcast News"
 "Three Dreams Denied"
 "The Road to Cincinnati"
 "Sorry Not Sorry"
 "A Springfield Summer Christmas for Christmas"
 "The Dad-Feelings Limited"
 "Diary Queen"
 "Wad Goals"
 "Yokel Hero"
 "Do Pizza Bots Dream of Electric Guitars"
 "Manger Things"
 "Uncut Femmes"
 "Burger Kings"
 "Panic on the Streets of Springfield"
 "Mother and Child Reunion"
 "The Man from G.R.A.M.P.A."
 "The Last Barfighter"
 "The Star of the Backstage"
 "Bart's in Jail!"
 "Treehouse of Horror XXXII" (Starring as J. Short BTC)
 "The Wayz We Were"
 "Lisa's Belly"
 "A Serious Flanders: Part One"
 "A Serious Flanders: Part Two"
 "Portrait of a Lackey on Fire"
 "Mothers and Other Strangers"
 "A Made Maggie"
 "The Longest Marge"
 "Pixelated and Afraid"
 "Boyz N the Highlands"
 "You Won't Believe What This Episode Is About – Act Three Will Shock You!"
 "Bart the Cool Kid"
 "Pretty Whittle Liar"
 "The Sound of Bleeding Gums"
 "My Octopus and a Teacher"
 "Girls Just Shauna Have Fun"
 "Marge the Meanie"
 "Meat is Murder"
 "Poorhouse Rock"

Futurama episodes 
"My Three Suns" (1999)
"Mars University" (1999)
"A Head in the Polls" (1999)
"The Deep South" (2000)
"The Cryonic Woman" (2000)
"Roswell That Ends Well" (2002)
"Where the Buggalo Roam" (2002)
"Neutopia" (2011)

Unhappily Ever After episodes
"Meter Maid"
"Getting More Than Some"
"College!"
"Experimenting in College"
"Making the Grade"
"Teacher's Pet"
"Excorsising Jennie"
"Shampoo"
"Rock 'n' Roll"
"Lightning Boy"
"The Tell-Tale Lipstick"
"Jack The Ripper"
"The Great Depression"
"The Rat"

References

External links 

 

1969 births
Emmy Award winners
Living people
American television writers
American male television writers
The Harvard Lampoon alumni
UC Berkeley College of Letters and Science alumni
American mathematicians